Samsung Galaxy Gio (GT-S5660) is a smartphone manufactured by Samsung and running the Android operating system.

It was announced at the 2011 Mobile World Congress as one of four low-end Samsung smartphones, along with Galaxy Ace, Galaxy Fit and Galaxy Mini.

The Galaxy Gio phone made its Canadian debut in August 2011. Initially available to Bell Canada, the Gio was soon made available at Virgin Mobile Canada and Solo Mobile. Starting in December 2011, Galaxy Gio was also made available in the United States as Samsung Repp on U.S. Cellular.

Features

Hardware 
Galaxy Gio has a  HVGA multi-touch, capacitive touchscreen, a 3.2-megapixel camera with auto focus, and an 800 MHz Qualcomm MSM7227 & MSM7627(Us Cellular) Turbo (ARMv6), 278 MB RAM, 158 Mb internal storage, 3G HSPA+, an FM radio with RDS support, GPS, Wi-Fi 802.11 b/g/n, and a 1350 mAh battery. In addition to the phone's internal memory, the device has a MicroSD card slot, and comes with 2 Gb MicroSD card (as new). With that phone, the bundled MicroSD card is the main location for storage of apps and user-generated data, such as photos and multimedia.

Software 
Galaxy Gio originally came with Android 2.2 "Froyo", with Samsung's TouchWiz user interface.

In early August 2011, Samsung officially rolled out the 2.3 "Gingerbread" update via Kies. In September 2011, Samsung rolled out an update in the Netherlands marked "PDA:KPS PHONE:KPA CSC:KP1 (XEN)".

Changes associated with the 2.3.6 update include a new lockscreen, a new phone icon, the blue-glow scrolling effect, and a few other cosmetic changes related to the system UI.

Samsung has not made Android 4.1 available for Gio due to its less powerful hardware, though users can upgrade via Root and ClockworkMod Recovery. MaclawStudio has also made available a bugless and stable port of the AOSP-ROM – both 4.0.x Ice Cream Sandwich and 4.1 Jelly Bean.

Because the native Android browser is outdated, modern websites can be visited with Firefox for Android by Mozilla. As the Galaxy Gio phone contains a central processor based on ARMv6 architecture, then the most recent Firefox version for ARMv6 devices is 31.3.0esr, released on 17 October 2015. Mozilla have since ceased development for this CPU architecture. The primary method to reduce Firefox resource usage is to install the NoScript Anywhere addon.

See also
List of Android devices
Galaxy Nexus

References

External links
 How to root the Samsung Galaxy Gio S5660
 Wiki explaining the status of CyanogenMod for Samsung Galaxy Gio (german)

S5660
Samsung smartphones
Android (operating system) devices
Mobile phones introduced in 2011
Mobile phones with user-replaceable battery